Rajanwala is a town near the bank of Chenab River in Jhang District in Pakistan. The nearest town is Chund Bharwana. In the time of the Mughal emperor Aurangzeb, the town was a business center, known for its market. A ritual fair was organized by Hindus in the nearby village of Massan.

Culture 
Agriculture is the main source of income. Different melā festivals are important parts of the town's cultural activity. The annual melā festival at the shrine of Syed Laal Ajmair and Saaid Jalaal is held for four days.

Sports 
Cricket is the most popular sport. There are two teams, Yong Jhoole Laal Cricket Club and Ali Hyder Cricket Club. Matches are held on every Eid at Laal Ajmair Cricket Ground.

Tent pegging is the main source of amusement. Many people here have their own horses and actively take part. Al Rajan Sadaat Tent Pegging Club is the main representative of the area. Other traditional sports include pirr-kaudi, dhodha, pithu garam, lukan meeti, baari and bateera/kurrar larai.

References

Populated places in Jhang District
Jhang District